Lockers Park School is a day and boarding preparatory and pre-preparatory school for boys, situated in 23 acres of countryside in Boxmoor, Hertfordshire. Its headmaster is Gavin Taylor.

History
Lockers Park was founded in 1874 by Henry Montagu Draper, an old boy of Rugby School. The new school was designed by Sidney Scott and has its own chapel which dates from the same era.

In the 1940s and 1950s, the veteran England all-round cricketer Frank Woolley (1887–1978) was the school's cricket coach.

Former pupils
See also :Category: People educated at Lockers Park School
The list of distinguished (or well-known) old boys of Lockers Park includes the following:
Prince Alemayehu, son of the Emperor of Ethiopia
Prince Maurice of Battenberg, a member of the Hesse aristocracy
Guy Burgess, spy
John Dermot Campbell (1898–1945), Ulster Unionist politician
Paul Channon, Baron Kelvedon (1935–2007), Conservative politician
Robert Henriques (1905-1967), writer and broadcaster
Edward James (1907–1984), poet
Sir Keith Joseph, Conservative politician
Mansoor Ali Khan, Nawab of Pataudi, captain of the Indian cricket team 
Saif Ali Khan, Indian film actor and titular Nawab of Pataudi
Major-General Sir Robert Laycock, Commando general during the Second World War
James Lees-Milne, architectural historian
Tom Mitford, brother of the Mitford Sisters
Louis Mountbatten, 1st Earl Mountbatten of Burma, last Viceroy of India
Basil Hamilton-Temple-Blackwood, 4th Marquess of Dufferin and Ava (1909 –1945), Conservative politician
Peter Watson (1908–1956), patron of the arts

Notes

Further reading

External links
 Official site

Boarding schools in Hertfordshire
Preparatory schools in Hertfordshire
Schools in Hemel Hempstead
Educational institutions established in 1874
1874 establishments in England